Martin Walker (born 1947) is the author of the popular Bruno detective series. After working at The Guardian from 1971 to 1999, Walker joined United Press International (UPI) in 2000 as an international correspondent in Washington, D.C., and is now editor-in-chief emeritus of UPI. He was a member of A.T. Kearney's Global Business Policy Council.

Life

He was educated at Harrow County School for Boys and Balliol College, Oxford. Walker lives in the Périgord/Dordogne in Southern France with his wife with whom he has two daughters.

He was on the staff of The Guardian from around 1971, working in a variety of positions, including bureau chief in Moscow and the United States, European editor, and assistant editor. One of the unsuccessful candidates for the editorship of The Guardian in 1995, when Alan Rusbridger was appointed in succession to Peter Preston, Walker resigned in 1999 after 28 years with the newspaper.

Walker joined United Press International (UPI) in 2000. While at UPI he was also an international correspondent. He is now editor-in-chief emeritus of UPI. He also holds a variety of other positions, including senior scholar at the Woodrow Wilson International Center for Scholars in Washington, D.C.; senior fellow of the World Policy Institute at The New School in New York; member of the board of directors of the Global Panel Foundation (Berlin, Copenhagen, Prague, Sydney and Toronto). He is also a contributing editor of the Los Angeles Timess Opinion section and of Europe magazine. Walker also is a regular commentator on CNN, Inside Washington and NPR.

Works

Walker has written several non-fiction books, including The National Front, Waking Giant: Gorbachev and Perestroika, The Cold War: A History, Clinton: The President They Deserve and America Reborn.

He's also written the historical thriller, The Caves of Perigord (2002).

Bruno, Chief of Police
He is also the author of the Bruno detective series set in the Périgord region of France, where Walker has a holiday home. The novels depict an unconventional village policeman, Benoît "Bruno" Courrèges, a passionate cook and former soldier who was wounded on a peacekeeping mission in the Balkans, who never carries his official gun and who has "long since lost the key to his handcuffs".

Bruno, Chief of Police. Quercus, London 2008, 
The Dark Vineyard. Quercus, London 2009, 
Black Diamond. Quercus, London 2010, 
The Crowded Grave. Quercus, London 2011, 
The Devil's Cave. Quercus, London 2012, 
"Bruno and the Carol Singers". Vintage, New York 2012,  (short story)
The Resistance Man. Quercus, London 2013, 
Children of War. Quercus, London 2014,  (US title: The Children Return)
The Dying Season. Quercus, London 2015,  (US title: The Patriarch)
"A Market Tale". Vintage, New York 2014,  (short story)
Fatal Pursuit. Quercus, London 2016, 
The Templars' Last Secret. Quercus, London 2017,  
A Taste for Vengeance Knopf, New York 2018, 
"The Chocolate War". Vintage, New York 2018,  (short story)
"A Birthday Lunch". Knopf, New York 2019,  (short story)
The Body in the Castle Well. Knopf, New York 2019, 
"Oystercatcher". Vintage, New York 2020,  (short story)
The Shooting at Chateau Rock. Knopf, New York 2020,  (released May 26, 2020)
The Coldest Case. Knopf, New York 2021,  (released August 03, 2021)
To Kill a Troubadour. Knopf, New York 2022,  (released August 09, 2022)

Prizes 

 2021: Prix Charbonnier

References

External links
 Website devoted to the Bruno novels
 

British male journalists
Living people
People educated at Harrow High School
Alumni of Balliol College, Oxford
1947 births